The San Diego-Imperial Council is headquartered in San Diego, California, and serves youth members and volunteer leaders through Scout units in San Diego and Imperial counties of Southern California, as well as a portion of Arizona.

Founded in 1916 as the Coronado Council, and the San Diego Council, in 1917 the two council merged to  make the San Diego County Council (#049). Founded in 1922, the Imperial County Council (#029) changed its name to Imperial-Yuma Area Council in 1929, and changed the name again in 1959 to Desert Trails Council. In 1993 Desert Trails and San Diego County merged to become Desert Pacific Council. Desert Pacific Council was renamed to San Diego-Imperial Council on January 3, 2005.

Organization
 Desert Trails (Imperial County)
 Palomar (Escondido, Ramona, San Marcos, Valley Center, Vista)
 Rancho San Luis Rey (Oceanside, Fallbrook, Camp Pendleton, Del Mar, Encinitas, Carlsbad)
 Rancho Mesa (Rancho Bernardo, Poway, Mira Mesa, Scripps Ranch)
 Crossroads (San Carlos, La Mesa, Spring Valley, Lemon Grove, Encanto)
 Coastal Sage (downtown, Logan Heights, City Heights, Coronado, Hillcrest, North Park, La Jolla, Pacific Beach, Point Loma, Tierrasanta, Clairemont, Kearny Mesa, Serra Mesa, University City)
 Bonita-Otay
 Magnolia (El Cajon, Santee, Lakeside, Alpine)
 Sweetwater (Bonita, Otay Ranch, Ocean View Hills, Chula Vista, Imperial Beach, San Ysidro, National City, Paradise Hills)

Camps
Mataguay Scout Ranch
Camp Balboa, Balboa Park
San Diego Youth Aquatic Center, aka Camp Fiesta Island

Order of the Arrow
Tiwahe Lodge #45 is the Order of the Arrow Lodge that services the San Diego Imperial Council.  It has a yearly average membership of 1,030 scouts and scouters.

Tiwahe Lodge was formed from the merger of Ashie Lodge #436 and Pang Lodge #532 in 1992. Tiwahe Lodge has been the recipient of the Quality Lodge Award 15 times in a row.  Tiwahe Lodge also received the National Service Award in 2005. Tiwahe is a member of Section W-4S in the Western Region of the Boy Scouts of America. Tiwahe is one of four lodges in this section, the other three are Wiatava #13, Cahuilla #127, and Ta Tanka #488.  Tiwahe Lodge has produced 3 Section Chiefs and 3 Section Advisors. Tiwahe lodge was also home to the 2011 Western Region Chief.

Tiwahe Lodge currently runs three lodge events throughout the year. The first is the Fall Fellowship Weekend in November, which consists of training and lodge officer elections.  Lodge Leadership Development is held in January and is the primary tool for training new lodge and chapter officers.  Spring Encampment is held in March and is a service weekend usually held at Camp Mataguay.

Tiwahe Lodge currently has ten chapters acting within the lodge: Allohak, Bitani, Chippewa, Elauwit, Hadaazli-to, Kah-Shinni, Naabaahii, Pischk, Shash-Tsoh, and Wulinaxin.

See also
Scouting in California

References

Boy Scout councils in California
Non-profit organizations based in San Diego
1993 establishments in California